The Order of Prince Edward Island is a civilian honour for merit in the Canadian province of Prince Edward Island. Instituted in 1996 by Lieutenant Governor Gilbert Clements, on the advice of the Cabinet under Premier Catherine Callbeck, the order is administered by the Governor-in-Council and is intended to honour current or former Prince Edward Island residents for conspicuous achievements in any field, being thus described as the highest honour amongst all others conferred by the Prince Edward Island Crown.

Structure and appointment
The Order of Prince Edward Island is intended to honour any current or former longtime resident of Prince Edward Island who has demonstrated a high level of individual excellence and achievement in any field, having made "remarkable contributions to the social, economic and cultural life of [Prince Edward Island] and its people." Although Canadian citizenship is not a requirement, those who are elected or appointed members of a governmental body are ineligible as long as they hold office, and only three people per year may be inducted into the order. The exception to these rules is the Chancellor of the Order, who simultaneously serves as the Lieutenant Governor of the province, and whose induction into the Order does not count against the three-person induction cap.

Nomination
The process of finding qualified individuals begins with submissions from the public to the Advisory Council of the Order of Prince Edward Island, which consists of the Chief Justice of Prince Edward Island, the President of the University of Prince Edward Island, the Clerk of the Executive Council, and two Members of the order from each of the province's three counties. This committee then makes its selected recommendations to the Cabinet, which vets the list and passes it on to the lieutenant governor. Posthumous nominations are not accepted, though an individual who dies after his or her name was submitted to the Honours and Advisory Council can still be retroactively made a Member of the Prince Edward Island. The lieutenant governor, ex officio a Member and the Chancellor of the Order of Prince Edward Island, then makes all appointments into the fellowship's single grade of membership by an Order in Council that bears the viceroyal sign-manual and the Great Seal of the province; thereafter, the new Members are entitled to use the post-nominal letters OPEI.

Insignia
Upon admission into the Order of Prince Edward Island, in a ceremony held at Government House in Charlottetown, new Members are presented with the order's insignia. The main badge, called the Medal of Merit, consists of a gold roundel medallion, the obverse in enamel bearing at its centre the escutcheon of the arms of Prince Edward Island, all surrounded by a blue collar with the words MERIT • PRINCE EDWARD ISLAND. The ribbon is patterned with vertical stripes in green, white, and rust, reflecting the colours of the province's foliage and oxidized soil; men wear the medallion suspended from this ribbon at the collar, while women carry theirs on a ribbon bow at the left chest. Members will also receive for wear on casual clothing a lapel pin, appearing as a smaller version of the Medal of Merit.

Inductees

Appointees into the Order of Prince Edward Island include:

 Angèle Arsenault , appointed 2005
 Reverend Éloi Arsenault , appointed 2004
 Georges Arsenault , appointed 2003
 Leone Bagnall , appointed 2005
 Carolyn Bateman , appointed 2016
 Chief Darlene Bernard , appointed 2008
 Léonce Bernard , appointed 2001
 Reverend Dr. F.W.P. Bolger , appointed 2004
 Emily Bryant , appointed 2012
 Marlene Bryenton , appointed 1998
 Garnet Rankin Buell , appointed 2008
 Marie Burge , appointed 1998
 William Callbeck , appointed 2011
 Dr. Sheldon Cameron , appointed 2006
 Alexander Bradshaw Campbell , appointed 2013
 Bill Campbell , appointed 2015
 Reverend Charles Cheverie , appointed 1996
 Gilbert R. Clements , appointed 1996
 Sibyl Cutcliffe , appointed 2012
 Eleanor Davies , appointed 2011
 Donald M. Deacon , appointed 2003
 Sister Mary Deighan , appointed 1997
 Dr. George Dewar , appointed 1996
 Vera Elizabeth Dewar , appointed 2013
 Gerald Sheldon Dixon , appointed 2015
 Dr. Dagny Dryer , appointed 2016
 Anna Duffy , appointed 2002
 Regis Duffy , appointed 2010
 Edith Eldershaw , appointed 1999
 Dr. Kent Ellis , appointed 1996
 J. Henri Gaudet , appointed 2000
 Allan Graham , appointed 2002
 Diane Griffin , appointed 2010
 Barbara Oliver Hagerman , appointed 2006
 H. Wayne Hambly , appointed 2014
 Wilma Hambly , appointed 2009
 Nancy Ann Hamill , appointed 2008
 James Hogan , appointed 1996
 Arthur Hudson , appointed 2000
 Dr. Albert "Bud" Ings , appointed 2012
 Derek Key , appointed 2005
 Frank Ledwell , appointed 2006
 Dorothy Lewis , appointed 2006
 H. Frank Lewis , appointed 2011
 Charles Linkletter , appointed 1997
 Elmer MacDonald , appointed 2009
 H. Wade MacLauchlan , appointed 2014
 William MacLean , appointed 2007
 Helen Stewart MacRae , appointed 1997
 Dr. Joyce Madigane , appointed 2013
 Dr. John H. Maloney , appointed 2001
 Maylea Manning , appointed 2001
 Shirley McGinn , appointed 2000
 Barbara McNeill , appointed 2004
 Heather Leanne Moyse , appointed 2014
 Ray Murphy , appointed 2007
 Dr. Hubert O'Hanley , appointed 1999
 Ulric Poirier , appointed 1996
 Marion Reid , appointed 1996
 Antoine Richard , appointed 1998
 Helen Robbins , appointed 2007
 Keptin John Joe Sark , appointed 2016
 Paul H. Schurman , appointed 1999
 Father Brady Smith , appointed 2010
 Kay Wall , appointed 2001
 Elmer Williams , appointed 2002
 Noel Wilson , appointed 2003
 Dr. David Wong , appointed 2013
 Frank Zakem , appointed 2009

See also
 Canadian order of precedence (decorations and medals)
 Symbols of Prince Edward Island
 State decoration

References

External links
 Order of Prince Edward Island webpage

Provincial and territorial orders of Canada
1996 establishments in Prince Edward Island
Prince Edward Island awards